"Forever More" is a song by American singer Puff Johnson, released on April 30, 1996, as the first single from her only studio album, Miracle (1996). The ballad was written by Johnson along with Sally Jo Dakota and Narada Michael Walden, while production was helmed by the latter, with Louis Biancaniello credited as associate producer.

Critical reception
Larry Flick from Billboard remarked that Johnson "effortlessly glides through this pop-sweetened R&B ballad", produced "with recognizable flair" by Walden. He added, "The song itself is a tad predictable but pleasantly executed. It is easy to imagine love-struck young girls swaying and singing along to this." A reviewer from Music Week rated it four out of five, writing, "Columbia's smooth soul diva follows up her huge Over & Over with another seductive, Whitney-esque smoocher, which she penned with Narada Michael Walden and Jermaine Dupri. Radio will lap it up." The magazine's Alan Jones commented, "Puff Johnson is a fine vocalist, rather like Whitney Houston without the frills, and this image is even more strongly evoked by Puff's majestic new single Forever More, which was co-authored by Narada Michael Walden, architect of many of Whitney's early career triumphs. It is a sonically soothing and memorable R&B ballad, lovingly embraced by Puff's tender vocals. It's one of those records that could hang around for a long time."

Chart performance
In the United States, "Forever More" peaked at number 63 on the Billboard Hot 100, number 31 on the Hot R&B/Hip-Hop Songs chart, and number 22 on the Rhythmic Songs chart. "Forever More" charted the highest in New Zealand, where it peaked at number five on the New Zealand Singles Chart. Elsewhere, the song became a top-30 hit in both Australia and the United Kingdom, peaking at number 29 in both countries. It also charted in the Netherlands, peaking at number 91.

Music video
The song's accompanying music video was directed by Greg Masuak. On his website, Masuak writes that the video was heavily edited to become a strictly African-American love story, although it was intended to be a multi-racial tribute to love. In parts of the music video, Puff is seeing playing with an elephant.

Track listings

Notes
 denotes associate producer
 denotes additional producer
 denotes co-producer

Credits and personnel
Credits lifted from the liner notes of Miracle.

 Louis Biancaniello – associate producer, instruments, programming
 David "Frazeman" Frazer – recording
 Jeff "G" Gray – assistant engineer
 Sandy Griffith – backing vocals
 Mick Guzauski – mixing
 Puff Johnson – backing vocals
 Janice Lee – coordinator
 Cherise Miller – coordinator

 Marc "Elvis" Reyburn – recording
 Claytoven Richardson – backing vocals
 Matt Rohr – additional recording
 Cynthia Shiloh – coordinator
 Annie Stocking – backing vocals
 Kulan Kevin Walden – coordinator
 Narada Michael Walden – arranger, producer

Charts

Weekly charts

Year-end charts

Release history

References

Puff Johnson songs
1990s ballads
1996 singles
1993 songs
Columbia Records singles
Song recordings produced by Narada Michael Walden
Songs written by Narada Michael Walden
Songs written by Sally Jo Dakota